Birth and Rebirth is an album by American jazz drummer Max Roach and saxophonist Anthony Braxton recorded in 1978 for the Italian Black Saint label.

Reception
The Allmusic review by Scott Yanow awarded the album 4½ stars, stating: "Braxton (who performs on alto, soprano, sopranino and clarinet) and Roach continually inspire each other, which is probably why they would record a second set the following year. Stimulating avant-garde music."

Track listing
All compositions by Max Roach and Anthony Braxton
 "Birth" - 9:40 
 "Magic and Music" - 6:36 
 "Tropical Forest" - 5:05 
 "Dance Griot" - 5:06 
 "Spirit Possession" - 6:44 
 "Soft Shoe" - 2:57 
 "Rebirth" - 7:16 
Recorded at Ricordi Studios in Milano, Italy on September 7, 1978

Personnel
Anthony Braxton - alto saxophone, soprano saxophone, sopranino saxophone, clarinet
Max Roach - drums

References

Black Saint/Soul Note albums
Max Roach albums
Anthony Braxton albums
1978 albums